Acacia aneura var. macrocarpa is a perennial shrub native to Australia. Commonly found in the Northwest Region of Australia.

See also
 List of Acacia species

References

aneura var. macrocarpa
macrocarpa
Flora of South Australia
Fabales of Australia
Acacias of Western Australia